This is a list of recipients of the Balzan Prize, one of the world's most prestigious academic awards. The International Balzan Prize Foundation awards four annual monetary prizes to people or organizations who have made outstanding achievements in the humanities, natural sciences, culture, and peace on an international level The Prizes are awarded in four subject areas: "two in literature, the moral sciences and the arts" and "two in the physical, mathematical and natural sciences and medicine." The special Prize for Humanity, Peace and Fraternity is presented at intervals of every three years or longer.

1960s–1970s
1961
Nobel Foundation (Sweden) --- Humanity, peace and brotherhood among peoples

1962
Andrey Kolmogorov (Soviet Union) --- Mathematics 	
Karl von Frisch (Austria) --- Biology 	
Paul Hindemith (Germany) --- Music 	
Samuel Eliot Morison (United States) --- History
Pope John XXIII (Vatican) --- Humanity, peace and brotherhood among peoples 	

1978
Mother Teresa of Calcutta (India) --- Humanity, peace and brotherhood among peoples

1979
Ernest Labrousse (France) and Giuseppe Tucci (Italy) --- History 	
Jean Piaget (Switzerland) --- Social and political sciences 	
Torbjörn Caspersson (Sweden) ---  Biology

1980s
1980
Enrico Bombieri (Italy) --- Mathematics 	
Hassan Fathy (Egypt) --- Architecture and town planning 	
Jorge Luis Borges (Argentina) --- Philology, linguistics and literary criticism

1981
Dan McKenzie (United Kingdom), Drummond Matthews (United Kingdom) and Frederick Vine (United Kingdom) --- Geology and geophysics 	
Josef Pieper (Germany) --- Philosophy 	
Paul Reuter (France) --- International public law

1982
Jean-Baptiste Duroselle (France) --- Social sciences 	
Kenneth Vivian Thimann (United Kingdom / United States) --- Pure and applied botany 	
Massimo Pallottino (Italy) --- Sciences of antiquity 	

1983
Edward Shils (United States) --- Sociology 	
Ernst Mayr (Germany / United States) --- Zoology 	
Francesco Gabrieli (Italy) --- Oriental studies 

1984
Jan Hendrik Oort (Netherlands) --- Astrophysics 
Jean Starobinski (Switzerland) --- History and criticism of the literatures 	
Sewall Wright (United States) --- Genetics 

1985
Ernst H. J. Gombrich (Austria / United Kingdom) --- History of western art 	
Jean-Pierre Serre (France) --- Mathematics

1986
 (France) --- Basic human rights 	
Otto Neugebauer (Austria / United States) --- History of science 	
Roger Revelle (United States) --- Oceanography / climatology 	
United Nations High Commissioner for Refugees (UNHCR) --- Humanity, peace and brotherhood among peoples 

1987
Jerome Seymour Bruner (United States) --- Human psychology 	
Phillip V. Tobias (South Africa) --- Physical anthropology 	
Richard W. Southern (United Kingdom) --- Medieval history 

1988
Michael Evenari (Israel) and Otto Ludwig Lange (Germany) --- Applied botany (incl. ecological aspects) 
René Étiemble (France) --- Comparative literature 	
Shmuel Noah Eisenstadt (Israel) --- Sociology

1989
Emmanuel Lévinas (France / Lithuania) --- Philosophy 	
Leo Pardi (Italy) --- Ethologie 	
Martin John Rees (United Kingdom) --- High energy astrophysics

1990s
1990
James Freeman Gilbert (United States) --- Geophysics (solid earth) 	
Pierre Lalive d'Epinay (Switzerland) --- Private international law 	
Walter Burkert (Germany) --- Study of the ancient world (Mediterranean area)

1991
György Ligeti (Hungary / Austria) --- Music
John Maynard Smith (United Kingdom) --- Genetics and evolution 
Vitorino Magalhães Godinho (Portugal) --- History: The emergence of Europe in the 15th and 16th centuries 
Abbé Pierre (Henri Grouèse) (France) --- Humanity, peace and brotherhood among peoples 

1992
Armand Borel (Switzerland) --- Mathematics 	
 (Gambia) --- Preventive medicine
Giovanni Macchia (Italy) --- History and criticism of the literatures 

1993
Jean Leclant (France) --- Art and archaeology of the ancient world
Lothar Gall (Germany) --- History: societies of the 19th and 20th centuries 
Wolfgang H. Berger (Germany / United States) --- Paleontology with special reference to oceanography 

1994
Fred Hoyle (United Kingdom) and Martin Schwarzschild (Germany / United States) --- Astrophysics (evolution of stars) 	
Norberto Bobbio (Italy) --- Law and political science (governments and democracy) 
 (France) --- Biology (cell structure with special reference to the nervous system)

1995
Alan J. Heeger (United States) --- Science of new non-biological materials 
Carlo M. Cipolla (Italy) --- Economic history 
Yves Bonnefoy (France) --- Art history and art criticism (as applied to European art from the Middle Ages to our times) 

1996
 (Germany) --- History: medieval cultures
Arnt Eliassen (Norway) --- Meteorology 	
Stanley Hoffmann (Austria / United States / France) --- Political sciences: contemporary international relations
International Committee of the Red Cross (ICRC) --- Humanity, peace and brotherhood among peoples

1997
Charles Coulston Gillispie (United States) --- History and philosophy of science 	
Stanley Jeyaraja Tambiah (Sri Lanka / United States) --- Social sciences: social anthropology 
Thomas Wilson Meade (United Kingdom) --- Epidemiology 	

1998
Andrzej Walicki (Poland / United States) --- History: the cultural and social history of the Slavonic world from the reign of Catherine the Great to the Russian revolutions of 1917 
Harmon Craig (United States) --- Geochemistry 	
Robert McCredie May (United Kingdom / Australia) --- Biodiversity 

1999
John Elliott (United Kingdom) --- History 1500-1800
Luigi Luca Cavalli-Sforza (Italy / United States) --- Science of human origins 	
Mikhail Gromov (Russia / France) --- Mathematics 	
Paul Ricœur (France) --- Philosophy

2000s
2000
Ilkka Hanski (Finland) --- Ecological sciences 
Martin Litchfield West (United Kingdom) --- Classical antiquity 
Michael Stolleis (Germany) --- Legal history since 1500 	
Michel G.E. Mayor (Switzerland) --- Instrumentation and techniques in astronomy and astrophysics
Abdul Sattar Edhi (Pakistan) --- Humanity, peace and brotherhood among peoples 	

2001
Claude Lorius (France) --- Climatology
James Sloss Ackerman (United States) --- History of architecture (including town planning and landscape design)
Jean-Pierre Changeux (France) --- Cognitive neurosciences 
Marc Fumaroli (France) --- Literary history and criticism (post 1500) 	

2002
Anthony Grafton (United States) --- History of the humanities 
Dominique Schnapper (France) --- Sociology 
Walter J. Gehring (Switzerland) --- Developmental biology 	
Xavier Le Pichon (France) --- Geology 

2003
Eric Hobsbawm (United Kingdom) --- European history since 1900 
Reinhard Genzel (Germany) --- Infrared astronomy 	
Serge Moscovici (France) --- Social psychology 
Wen-Hsiung Li (Taiwan / United States) --- Genetics and evolution 	

2004
Andrew Colin Renfrew (United Kingdom) --- Prehistoric Archaeology 	
Michael Marmot (United Kingdom) --- Epidemiology 	
Nikki R. Keddie (United States) --- The Islamic world from the end of the 19th to the end of the 20th century 
Pierre Deligne (Belgium) --- Mathematics 
Community of Sant'Egidio --- Humanity, peace and brotherhood among peoples

2005
Lothar Ledderose (Germany) --- History of the art of Asia
Peter Hall (United Kingdom) --- The social and cultural history of cities since the beginning of the 16th century 	
Peter R. Grant (United Kingdom) and Rosemary Grant (United States) --- Population biology 	
Russell J. Hemley (United States) and Ho-kwang (David) Mao (China) --- Mineral physics

2006
Ludwig Finscher (Germany) --- History of western music since 1600
Quentin Skinner (United Kingdom) --- Political thought: history and theory
Elliott M. Meyerowitz (United States) and Christopher R. Somerville (Canada) --- Plant molecular genetics

2007
Sumio Iijima (Japan) --- Nanoscience	
Bruce A. Beutler (United States) and Jules A. Hoffmann (France) --- Innate Immunity 	
Michel Zink (France) --- European Literature (1000 - 1500)
Rosalyn Higgins (United Kingdom) --- International Law since 1945
Karlheinz Böhm (Austria) --- Humanity, peace and brotherhood among peoples 

2008
Maurizio Calvesi (Italy) --- The Visual Arts since 1700  
Thomas Nagel (Serbia / United States) --- Moral Philosophy   
Ian H. Frazer (Australia) --- Preventive Medicine, including Vaccination  
Wallace S. Broecker (United States) --- Science of Climate Change    

2009
Terence Cave (United Kingdom) --- Literature since 1500 
Michael Grätzel (Germany / Switzerland) --- Science of New Materials  
Brenda Milner (United Kingdom / Canada) --- Cognitive Neurosciences  
 (Italy) --- History of Science

2010s
2010
 (Germany) --- History of theatre in all its aspects
Carlo Ginzburg (Italy) --- European History (1400 - 1700)  
Jacob Palis (Brazil) --- Mathematics (pure or applied) 
Shinya Yamanaka (Japan) --- Stem Cells: Biology and potential applications

2011
Peter Brown (Ireland) --- Ancient History (The Graeco-Roman World)
Bronislaw Baczko (Poland) --- Enlightenment Studies
Russell Scott Lande (United States / United Kingdom) --- Theoretical Biology or Bioinformatics
Joseph Ivor Silk (United States / United Kingdom) --- The Early Universe (From the Planck Time to the First Galaxies)

2012
Ronald Dworkin (United States) --- Jurisprudence 
Reinhard Strohm (Germany) --- Musicology
Kurt Lambeck (Australia) --- Solid Earth Sciences, with emphasis on interdisciplinary research
David Baulcombe (United Kingdom) --- Epigenetics

2013 
André Vauchez (France) --- Medieval History 
Manuel Castells (Spain) --- Sociology
Alain Aspect (France) --- Quantum Information Processing and Communication
Pascale Cossart (France) --- Infectious diseases: basic and clinical aspects

2014
Mario Torelli (Italy) --- Classical Archaeology 
Ian Hacking (Canada) --- Epistemology and Philosophy of Mind 
G. David Tilman (United States) --- Basic and/or applied Plant Ecology
Dennis Sullivan (United States) --- Mathematics (pure or applied)
Vivre en Famille (France) --- Humanity, peace and brotherhood among peoples

2015
Hans Belting (Germany) --- History of European Art (1300-1700)
Joel Mokyr  (Netherland / United States / Israel) --- Economic History
Francis Halzen (Belgium / United States) --- Astroparticle Physics including neutrino and gamma-ray observation
David Karl (United States) --- Oceanography

2016
Piero Boitani (Italy) --- Comparative Literature
Reinhard Jahn (Germany) --- Molecular and Cellular Neuroscience, including neurodegenerative and developmental aspects
Federico Capasso (Italy) --- Applied Photonics
Robert Keohane (United States) --- International Relations: History and Theory

2017
Aleida Assmann (Germany) and Jan Assmann (Germany) --- Collective Memory  
Bina Agarwal (India / United Kingdom) --- Gender Studies
Robert D. Schreiber (United States) and James P. Allison (United States) --- Immunological Approaches in Cancer Therapy
Michaël Gillon (Belgium) --- The Sun's Planetary System and Exoplanets

2018
Éva Kondorosi (Hungary / France) --- Chemical Ecology
Detlef Lohse (Germany) --- Fluid Dynamics 
Jürgen Osterhammel (Germany) --- Global History
Marilyn Strathern (United Kingdom) --- Social Anthropology
Terre des hommes Foundation (Switzerland) --- Humanity, Peace and Fraternity among Peoples

2019
Jacques Aumont (France) --- Film Studies
Michael Cook (United States / United Kingdom) --- Islamic Studies
Luigi Ambrosio (Italy) --- Theory of Partial Differential Equations

2020s

2020
Susan Trumbore (US / Germany) --- Earth System Dynamics
Jean-Marie Tarascon (France) --- Environmental Challenges: Materials Science for Renewable Energy
Joan Martinez Alier (Spain) --- Environmental Challenges: Responses from the Social Sciences and the Humanities
Antônio Augusto Cançado Trindade (Brazil) --- Human Rights

2021
Saul Friedländer (France / US) --- Holocaust and Genocide Studies
Jeffrey I. Gordon (US) --- Microbiome in Health and Disease
Alessandra Buonanno (Italy / US) and Thibault Damour (France) --- Gravitation: physical and astrophysical aspects
Giorgio Buccellati  and Marilyn Kelly-Buccellati (Italy / USA) --- Art and Archaeology of the Ancient Far East

2022
Robert Langer (US) --- Biomaterials for Nanomedicine and Tissue Engineering
Martha Nussbaum (US) --- Moral Philosophy
Dorthe Dahl-Jensen (Denmark) and Hans Oerlemans (Netherlands) --- Glaciation and Ice-Sheet Dynamics
Philip Bohlman (US) --- Ethnomusicology

References

External links
 
 

Science-related lists
Science and technology awards
Lists of award winners
Awards established in 1961